Tabernaemontana penduliflora is a species of plant in the family Apocynaceae. It is found in Nigeria to Zaïre.

References

penduliflora